Magnum Force is a 1973 American neo-noir vigilante action thriller film and the second to feature Clint Eastwood as maverick cop Harry Callahan after the 1971 film Dirty Harry. Ted Post, who had previously worked with Eastwood on Rawhide and Hang 'Em High, directed the film. The screenplay was written by John Milius and Michael Cimino (who later worked with Eastwood on Thunderbolt and Lightfoot). The film score was composed by Lalo Schifrin. This film features early appearances by David Soul, Tim Matheson, and Robert Urich. At 124 minutes, it is the longest of the five Dirty Harry films.

Plot 
After being acquitted of a mass murder on a legal technicality, mobster Carmine Ricca drives away from court in his limousine. While traveling on a city road, the driver is pulled over by a San Francisco Police Department (SFPD) motorcycle cop, who calmly guns down every man in the car. Inspector Harry Callahan visits the crime scene with his new partner, Earlington "Early" Smith, despite the fact that the two are supposed to be on stakeout duty. Their superior, Lieutenant Neil Briggs, seems eager to keep him out of the murder investigation.

While visiting the airport, Callahan helps deal with two men trying to hijack an airplane. He later meets rookies Phil Sweet, John Davis, Alan "Red" Astrachan, and Mike Grimes while visiting the police firing range. Sweet is an ex-United States Army Ranger and Vietnam veteran with great marksmanship skills. His friends are not that different. Another motorcycle cop shoots up a pool party, again leaving behind no usable evidence of his crime.

As Callahan and Early take down criminals at a drugstore, a pimp murders a prostitute for withholding money from him. The next day, the pimp is killed by a patrolman. While investigating the scene, Callahan realizes that the culprit is a cop. He assumes him to be his old friend Charlie McCoy, who has become despondent and suicidal after leaving his wife, Carol. Later, a motorcycle cop murders drug kingpin Lou Guzman. The killer, revealed to be Davis, encounters McCoy in the parking garage and guns him down.

At an annual shooting competition, Callahan learns that Davis was the first officer to arrive after the murders of Guzman and McCoy. Callahan retrieves a slug from Davis' Colt and has ballistics match it to the bullets from the Guzman murder. Callahan begins to suspect that a secret death squad within the SFPD is responsible for the killings. Briggs insists that Ricca's former associate, Frank Palancio, is the real culprit. Callahan persuades Briggs to assign Davis and Sweet as back up for a raid on Palancio's offices. However, Palancio and his gang are tipped off via a phone call, Sweet is killed by a shotgun blast, and all of Palancio's men die in the ensuing shootout with the police. Palancio attempts to escape, but Callahan jumps on the hood of his car, causing him to lose control and crash into a crane, killing him. Briggs angrily suspends Callahan for the death of Sweet. After returning home, Callahan finds Davis, Astrachan, and Grimes waiting for him, presenting him with an ultimatum to side with them; Callahan refuses. While checking his mailbox, Callahan discovers a bomb left by the vigilantes and manages to defuse it. A second bomb, however, kills Early before Callahan can warn him.

Callahan then learns that Briggs is the secret leader of the death squad. Briggs defends his actions, claiming that he is only doing what the broken legal system cannot. At gunpoint, Briggs orders Callahan to drive to an undisclosed location while being followed by Grimes. Callahan manages to disarm Briggs and force him out of the car before running Grimes over. Davis and Astrachan appear, causing Callahan to flee onto an old aircraft carrier in a shipbreaker's yard. Callahan kills Astrachan and takes his motorcycle, leading Davis in a series of jumps between ships. The chase ends with Davis driving off the ship into the San Francisco Bay and dying on impact. Callahan is then confronted at gunpoint by Briggs. The lieutenant mocks Callahan and threatens to have him prosecuted. As Callahan backs away from the car, he surreptitiously activates the timer on his mailbox bomb and tosses it in the back seat, killing Briggs moments later. Callahan then proclaims, "A man's got to know his limitations."

Cast

Production

Development 
Writer John Milius came up with a storyline in which a group of rogue young officers in the SFPD systematically exterminate the city's worst criminals, conveying the idea that even worse rogue cops than Dirty Harry exist. Terrence Malick had introduced the concept in an unused draft for the first film; director Don Siegel disliked the idea and had Malick's draft thrown out, but Clint Eastwood remembered it for this film. Eastwood specifically wanted to convey that, despite the 1971 film's perceived politics, Harry was not a complete vigilante. David Soul, Tim Matheson, Robert Urich, and Kip Niven were cast as the young vigilante cops. Milius was a gun aficionado and political conservative, and the film would extensively feature gun shooting in practice, competition, and on the job. Given this strong theme in the film, the title was soon changed from Vigilance to Magnum Force in deference to the .44 magnum that Harry liked to use. Milius thought it was important to remind the audiences of the original film by incorporating the line "Do ya feel lucky?" repeated in the opening credits.

With Milius committed to filming Dillinger, Michael Cimino was later hired to revise the script, overseen by Ted Post, who was to direct. According to Milius, his script did not contain any of the final action sequences (the car chase and climax on the aircraft carriers). His was a "simple script". The addition of the character Sunny was done at the suggestion of Eastwood, who reportedly received letters from women asking for "a female to hit on Harry" (not the other way around).

Milius later said he did not like the film and wished Don Siegel had directed it, as originally intended:

Directing 
Eastwood himself was initially offered the role of director, but declined. Ted Post, who had previously directed Eastwood in Rawhide and Hang 'Em High, was hired. Buddy Van Horn was the second unit director. Both Eastwood and Van Horn went on to direct the final two entries in the series, Sudden Impact and The Dead Pool, respectively.

Filming 
Frank Stanley was hired as cinematographer. Filming commenced in late April 1973. During filming, Eastwood encountered numerous disputes with Post over who was calling the shots in directing the film, and Eastwood refused to authorize two important scenes directed by Post in the film because of time and expenses; one of them was at the climax to the film with a long shot of Eastwood on his motorcycle as he confronts the rogue cops. As with many of his films, Eastwood was intent on shooting it as smoothly as possible, often refusing to do retakes over certain scenes.  Post later remarked: "A lot of the things he said were based on pure, selfish ignorance, and showed that he was the man who controlled the power. By Magnum Force, Clint's ego began applying for statehood". Post remained bitter with Eastwood for many years and claims disagreements over the filming affected his career afterwards. According to second unit director of photography Rexford Metz, "Eastwood would not take the time to perfect a situation. If you've got 70% of a shot worked out, that's sufficient for him, because he knows his audience will accept it."

Music 
 Orchestra arranged and conducted by Lalo Schifrin including
 Bud Shank - reeds
 Carol Kaye - electric bass
 Howard Roberts, Dennis Budimir, Tommy Tedesco - guitar
 Max Bennett - double bass
 Emil Richards - percussion

Controversy 
The film received negative publicity in 1974 when it was discovered that the scene where the prostitute is killed with drain cleaner had allegedly inspired the infamous Hi-Fi murders, with the two killers believing the method would be as efficient as it was portrayed in the film. The killers said that they were looking for a unique murder method when they stumbled upon the film, and had they not seen the movie, would have chosen a method from another film. The drain cleaner reference was repeated in at least two other films, including Heathers (1988) and Urban Legend (1998).
According to scriptwriter John Milius, this drain cleaner scene was never meant to be filmed, but was only mentioned in his original script.

Release

Box office 
In the film's opening week, it grossed $6,871,011 from 401 theatres. In the United States, the film made a total of $44,680,473, making it more successful than the first film and the sixth highest-grossing film of 1973.

Theatrical rentals were $19.4 million in the United States and Canada and $9.5 million overseas for a worldwide total of $28.9 million.

Reception 
The New York Times critics such as Nora Sayre criticized the conflicting moral themes of the film, and Frank Rich believed it "was the same old stuff". Gene Siskel of the Chicago Tribune gave the film two-and-a-half stars out of four and wrote, "The problem with Magnum Force is that this new side of Harry—his antivigilantism—is never made believable in the context of his continuing tendency to brandish his .44 magnum revolver as if it were his phallus. The new, 'Clean Harry' doesn't cut it. Some of the film's action sequences do." Kevin Thomas of the Los Angeles Times found the film "too preoccupied in celebrating violence to keep it in focus." Pauline Kael, a harsh critic of Eastwood's for many years, mocked his performance as Dirty Harry, commenting, "He isn't an actor, so one could hardly call him a bad actor. He'd have to do something before we could consider him bad at it. And acting isn't required of him in Magnum Force." Gary Arnold of The Washington Post was positive, praising the film as "an ingenious and exciting crime thriller" with "a less self-righteous message" than the original Dirty Harry. Gary Crowdus wrote in Cinéaste, "We are left with the comforting assurance that when we need him, Harry (and all the cops like him who do the 'dirty' jobs no one else wants) will be there protecting us from the lunatic fringes of both Left and Right. Sure, Harry may be a little trigger-happy, but at least he shoots the right people. The problem, however, one which the film raises but never resolves, is who determines the definition of 'right' people?"

On Rotten Tomatoes, the film has a score of 70% based on 27 reviews, with the critic consensus being "Magnum Force ups the ante for the Dirty Harry franchise with faster action and thrilling stuntwork."

See also 

 List of American films of 1973
 Extreme Justice

Notes

References

Bibliography

External links 

 
 
 
 

1973 films
1970s action thriller films
American action thriller films
American sequel films
Dirty Harry
Fictional portrayals of the San Francisco Police Department
Films about police brutality
Films about terrorism in the United States
Films directed by Ted Post
Films set in San Francisco
Films set in the San Francisco Bay Area
Films shot in San Francisco
Films set in 1972
American serial killer films
Films about police corruption
American vigilante films
Films about police misconduct
American police detective films
Warner Bros. films
Films with screenplays by John Milius
Films scored by Lalo Schifrin
American neo-noir films
1970s English-language films
1970s American films